The Global Development Network (GDN) is a worldwide network of research and policy institutes working to provide new perspectives to the development challenges of our time. A spin-off of the World Bank, GDN works to make policy-relevant research accelerate the pace of global development. The Government of India has granted it the status of international organization. GDN is engaged in research issues related to social and economic development, and encourages researchers by providing financial resources, mentoring support and a platform to share their research.

Every year GDN invites researchers, policy-makers and policy analysts to its annual conference. For instance, its 2012 annual conference was held in Budapest, Hungary (co-organised by Central European University) and the 2013 conference was held in Manila, Philippines in partnership with the Asian Development Bank (ADB), the East Asian Development Network (EADN) and the Philippine Institute for Development Studies (PIDS). The 2018 conference was held in New Delhi on the topic of Science, Technology and Innovation for Development.

History
The idea of a Global Development Network was conceived at a meeting organized by The World Bank in Washington in May 1997 after British journalist Shiv Satchit had founded and registered Global Development Network Ltd (GDN became its working name) with the Companies House and the Charity Commissioners as a non-profit organisation in 1995. The social science research organization was dedicated to the promotion of policy-oriented research in developing and transition countries. He was supported by his co-directors Raymond Knight, a British financial consultant and psychologist Dr Diwakar Sukul. Please refer to http://opencharities.org/charities/1049342 for evidence. The present participants include the heads of GDN's regional network partners and representatives of various bilateral and multilateral organizations and academic associations including United Nations Development Programme, the International Economics Association and The World Bank. It was not until December 1999, that GDN was launched as a response to the perceived paucity of support for research emanating from the developing and transitional world.

GDN moved out of the World Bank offices in Washington DC and started operating as an independent network of research and policy institutes with the goal of generating and sharing knowledge, building research capacity and bridging the gap between ideas and policies for development. It is currently headquartered in New Delhi, India and works in over 60 countries worldwide.

GDNet
GDNet was GDN's electronic voice. The GDNet was located in Cairo. It is now closed. GDN supported studies may now be found on www.gdn.int/research

See also
 Researchers Alliance for Development
 Development studies

References

 Diane Stone, ed. Banking on Knowledge: The Genesis of the Global Development Network. London: Routledge, 2000.
 Diane Stone. "The ‘Knowledge Bank’ and The Global Development Network." Global Governance  9.1 (2003): 43–61.

Further reading

External links
 GDN's official website

Economic development organizations